is a Japanese rugby union player who plays as a prop for Japanese club Suntory Sungoliath.

In his home country he plays for Suntory Sungoliath whom he joined in 2014.   He was also named in the first ever  squad which will compete in Super Rugby from the 2016 season.   Kakinaga is a Japanese international who debuted against  in 2014, however he did not make the squad for the 2015 Rugby World Cup.

References

1991 births
Living people
Japanese rugby union players
Japan international rugby union players
Rugby union props
Tokyo Sungoliath players
Sunwolves players
Sportspeople from Fukuoka (city)
21st-century Japanese people